Rhytiphora ferruginea is a species of beetle in the family Cerambycidae. It was described by Per Olof Christopher Aurivillius in 1917. It is known from Australia.

References

ferruginea
Beetles described in 1917